Snap the Whip is an 1872 oil painting by Winslow Homer. It depicts a group of children playing crack the whip in a field in front of a small red schoolhouse. With more of America's population moving to cities, the portrait depicts the simplicity of rural agrarian life that Americans were beginning to leave behind in the post-Civil War era, evoking a mood of nostalgia.

Homer spent several summers in New York's Hudson Valley, and is said to have been inspired to paint this scene by local boys playing at the Hurley schoolhouse.

Homer painted a second version, of similar date, which is now in the Metropolitan Museum of Art, New York. In this, he retains the schoolhouse but the background hillscape is removed, making the location less regionally specific.

References

External links
 Snap the Whip on the Butler Museum of Art homepage.
 Snap the Whip Analysis of 'Snap the Whip'.

Paintings by Winslow Homer
1872 paintings
Paintings in Youngstown, Ohio